The Swiss Music Awards (SMA) is Switzerland's largest award ceremony for music, and serves to promote the national music scene and showcase its cultural diversity. The event allows newcomers to introduce their music to a broader public, while also honouring the accomplishments of the country's most successful musicians. The show is broadcast live.

Winners

2008

2009

2010

2011

2012

2013

2014

2015

2016

2017

2018

2019

2020

2021

References

External links
 Official website

Swiss awards
Awards established in 2008